Mud Run is a tributary of Green Creek in Columbia County, Pennsylvania, in the United States. The stream's watershed has an area of 13.3 square miles and is located in Greenwood Township, Orange Township, and Mount Pleasant Township. The stream is in the ridge and valley physiographic province. The Kramer Covered Bridge crosses the stream.

Course

Mud Run begins in Greenwood Township on the western side of Bunker Hill. It flows south at first and after a short distance crosses Pennsylvania Route 254. The stream then turns southeast and flows into the Greenwood Valley. It then turns east and flows parallel to the southern edge of the valley for a number of miles, receiving several unnamed tributaries on the way. Near its mouth, the stream bends southeast and flows into Green Creek at the border between Greenwood Township and Orange Township.

Hydrology
The sediment loads are not significantly affected by the area's geology.

The entirety of Mud Run and all its tributaries are considered by the Pennsylvania Department of Environmental Protection to be impaired, with the exception of the streams in the watershed of Mud Run's final tributary.

Geography and geology

Mud Run is located in the ridge and valley physiographic province.

The elevation of the stream near its mouth is exactly . There are steep slopes in the watershed.

The K-factor, a measure of inherent soil erodability of the Mud Run watershed is 0.3 for wetlands, 0.29 for cropland, 0.284 for hay and pastures, and 0.26 for forests. The watershed's LS factor, which concerns slope steepness and length, is 4.705 in forests, 1.348 in hay and pastures.

Watershed
The watershed of Mud Run has an area of 13.3 square miles. Much of the watershed, including the entirety of the stream and its tributaries, is in Greenwood Township. However, parts of the watershed are located in Orange Township and Mount Pleasant Township. The largest use of land in the watershed is agriculture, which makes up 49.3% of the watershed's area. 1,756.9 acres are hay and pasture and 2,394.4 are cropland. Forested land makes up nearly as much of the watershed, 45.4%. The remainder of the land is designated as "low-intensity development" by the Pennsylvania Department of Environmental Protection (5.2%), or is a wetland (0.1%).

Biology
Mud Run is designated as a trout-stocked fishery and a migratory fishery.

Conservation farming is not extensively practiced in the watershed of Mud Run. There are few or no riparian buffers on the stream. The P factor of the watershed, which concerns conservation farming practices, is on a scale of 0 to 1, 0.45 in the watershed's agricultural lands, 0.52 in forests, and 0.1 in wetlands.

History and etymology
Mud Run is named for the fact that it is often muddy, especially after significant rainfall.

The Kramer Covered Bridge No. 113 crosses Mud Run. It was built in 1881 and named after Alexander Kramer, a farmer in the area.

See also
Rickard Hollow, next tributary of Green Creek going upstream
List of tributaries of Fishing Creek (North Branch Susquehanna River)

References

Rivers of Columbia County, Pennsylvania
Tributaries of Fishing Creek (North Branch Susquehanna River)
Rivers of Pennsylvania